Lost Creek is a stream in Crawford and Washington counties in the U.S. state of Missouri. It is a tributary of Courtois Creek.

Lost Creek most likely was named for its status as a losing stream.

See also
List of rivers of Missouri

References

Rivers of Crawford County, Missouri
Rivers of Washington County, Missouri
Rivers of Missouri